Single Stop is a nonprofit organization that aims to reduce poverty and promote economic mobility in the U.S. by connecting people to available government and nonprofit programs, benefits and services through a coordinated “one-stop shop” solution.

History
Founded by Elisabeth Mason as a national nonprofit in 2007, Single Stop grew out of a New York City-based initiative of the Robin Hood Foundation to reduce poverty and build economic security for individuals and families by increasing their access to public benefits and financial, legal, and tax services.

In January 2016, Christy Reeves succeeded Elisabeth Mason as CEO of Single Stop.

In November 2021, Martin Hanna became the president and CEO of Single Stop.

Approach
Single Stop locates its services within organizations already serving low-income Americans, such as food pantries, schools, and health centers. Staff is trained to screen individuals for the benefits and services for which they may be eligible as well as provide assistance in accessing those resources.

Single Stop's initiatives focus on creating financial stability for such specific low-income populations as community college students and veterans. On campus, Single Stop assists community colleges in retaining students through completion, thus reducing dropout rates and increasing students’ future income. Single Stop also helps the Office of Veterans Affairs transition veterans back to civilian life and reduce the number of veterans living in poverty.

According to the Stanford Social Innovation Review, Single Stop “has grown fast, and it’s poised to grow still more. Its goal, according to [CEO] Mason, is to serve more than 1 million households annually by 2018. By expanding its reach into community colleges, veterans’ facilities, and other venues, Single Stop aims to equip more and more clients with the skills, services, and benefits that they need to gain a shot at sustainable economic security.”

Single Stop was cited by Fast Company as one of “the world’s top ten most innovative companies of 2015 in social good” for its work in developing software that will enable individuals to self-screen for benefits via a mobile phone or web browser without having to visit a Single Stop office. The software was scheduled to launch in 2016, but is still not available today.

Citations

References

Non-profit organizations based in the United States